The Wireless Telegraphy Act 2006 (c 36) is an Act of the Parliament of the United Kingdom. This Act repealed the Wireless Telegraphy Act 1949.

The Wireless Telegraphy Act 2006 had as its purpose to "consolidate enactments about wireless telegraphy". The Act was successful as cited in Office of Communications and another v. Floe Telecom Ltd [2009] EWCA Civ 47 to show that in the absence of a licence or exemption granted or made under Section 8 of the Act, the use of Global System for Mobile Communications (GSM) gateways (including Commercial Multi-User Gateways) for the purpose of providing a telecommunications service by way of business to another person is unlawful.

Section 126 - Short title and commencement
Section 126(2) provides that the Act came into force at the end of the period of three months that began on the date on which it was passed. The word "months" means calendar months. The day (that is to say, 8 November 2006) on which the Act was passed (that is to say, received royal assent) is included in the period of three months. This means that the Act came into force on 8 February 2007.

See also
Wireless Telegraphy Acts

References
Halsbury's Statutes,

External links
The Wireless Telegraphy Act 2006, as amended from the National Archives.
The Wireless Telegraphy Act 2006, as originally enacted from the National Archives.
Explanatory notes to the Wireless Telegraphy Act 2006.

United Kingdom Acts of Parliament 2006
Telegraphy
Radio in the United Kingdom
Telecommunications in the United Kingdom
Telecommunications law